Bridge No. 2305, also known locally as the Burton Brook Bridge, is a historic bridge carrying U.S. Route 44 (US 44; Main Street) over Burton Brook in the Lakeville village of Salisbury, Connecticut. Built in 1873, this masonry arch bridge is a rare surviving example in the state of a typical late-19th century road bridge. It was listed on the National Register of Historic Places in 2007.

Description and history
The Burton Brook Bridge is located in a residential area to the north of Lakeville's village center, carrying Main Street, a major east-west route, across Burton Brook between Bostwick and Walton Streets. Burton Brook flows roughly east, and the bridge is thus oriented roughly north-south. It is fashioned out of locally quarried marble, with its exterior finished in roughly dressed mortared square blocks. The bridge is flanked on either side by iron-railed pedestrian bridges.

According to historic maps of the village, a bridge has stood at or near this site since at least 1811.  The bridge was built in 1873-74 for the town by Lorenzo Tupper, a local stonemason.  Tupper was also a prominent local businessman who served in a variety of town offices, including on its road commission.  The bridge was taken over by the state when the route of US 44 was designated in 1935 by the state.  The bridge has survived use on a major roadway in part because it was engineered to withstand heavy loads of iron ore that were transported through the area in the late 19th century.

See also
 
 
 
 
 National Register of Historic Places listings in Litchfield County, Connecticut
 List of bridges on the National Register of Historic Places in Connecticut

References

Bridges on the National Register of Historic Places in Connecticut
National Register of Historic Places in Litchfield County, Connecticut
Bridges completed in 1873
Bridges in Litchfield County, Connecticut
Salisbury, Connecticut
U.S. Route 44
Stone arch bridges in the United States
Road bridges in Connecticut
Bridges of the United States Numbered Highway System